The 1972–73 season was the 74th completed season of The Football League.

Liverpool championship win meant they claimed their first trophy since 1966 in Bill Shankly's penultimate season as manager despite competition from Arsenal, Leeds United, Ipswich Town and Wolverhampton Wanderers.

Manchester United sacked manager Frank O'Farrell after 18 months in charge. He had been unable to mount a title challenge. Tommy Docherty, the 44-year-old Scottish national coach and former Aston Villa manager, was appointed as his successor. Bobby Charlton and Denis Law both played their last games for the club while George Best's appearances were becoming increasingly rare.

Burnley and Queens Park Rangers won promotion to the First Division. Huddersfield Town's decline continued as they slid into the Third Division, where they were joined by Brighton & Hove Albion.

Bolton Wanderers and Notts County occupied the two promotion places in the Third Division. Rotherham United, Brentford, 
Swansea City and Scunthorpe United were relegated to the Fourth Division.

Hereford United were promoted from the Fourth Division in their first season as a Football League club. They had been elected to the Football League a year earlier after winning the Southern League and achieving a shock win over Newcastle United in the FA Cup. They were joined in the promotion zone by champions Southport, Cambridge United and Aldershot. Newport County missed promotion only on goal average. There were no arrivals or departures in the league for 1973.

Final league tables and results

The tables below are reproduced here in the exact form that they can be found at The Rec.Sport.Soccer Statistics Foundation website and in Rothmans Book of Football League Records 1888–89 to 1978–79, with home and away statistics separated.

Beginning with the season 1894–95, clubs finishing level on points were separated according to goal average (goals scored divided by goals conceded), or more properly put, goal ratio. In case one or more teams had the same goal difference, this system favoured those teams who had scored fewer goals. The goal average system was eventually scrapped beginning with the 1976–77 season.

Since the Fourth Division was established in the 1958–59 season, the bottom four teams of that division have been required to apply for re-election.

First Division

Results

Maps

Second Division

Results

Maps

Third Division

Results

Maps

Fourth Division

Results

Maps

See also
 1972-73 in English football

External links
 Season 1972-73 complete complete lineups, tables and squads at Historical Football Lineups

References

Ian Laschke: Rothmans Book of Football League Records 1888–89 to 1978–79. Macdonald and Jane’s, London & Sydney, 1980.

 
English Football League seasons